Thomas Perry (born 1947) is an American mystery and thriller novelist. He received a 1983 Edgar Award from the Mystery Writers of America for Best First Novel.

Writings
Perry's work has covered a variety of fictional suspense starting with The Butcher's Boy, which received a 1983 Edgar Award from the Mystery Writers of America for Best First Novel, followed by Metzger's Dog, Big Fish, Island, and Sleeping Dogs.  He then launched the critically acclaimed Jane Whitefield series: Vanishing Act (chosen as one of the "100 Favorite Mysteries of the Century" by the Independent Mystery Booksellers Association), Dance for the Dead, Shadow Woman, The Face Changers, Blood Money,  Runner, and Poison Flower.

Perry developed a non-series list of mysteries with Death Benefits, Pursuit (which won a Gumshoe Award in 2002), Dead Aim, Night Life,  Fidelity, and Strip. The New York Times selected Night Life for its best seller selection. In The Informant, released in 2011, Perry brought back the hit-man character first introduced in The Butcher's Boy and later the protagonist in Sleeping Dogs.

The Informant was awarded the 2012 Barry Award for Best Thriller. Eddie's Boy received the 2021 Barry Award for Best Thriller. In 2021, Vanishing Act was included in Parade'''s list of "101 Best Mystery Books of All Time".

Biography
Perry was born in Tonawanda, New York, in 1947. He received a B.A. from Cornell University in 1969 and his Ph.D. in English Literature from the University of Rochester in 1974.  He has been a laborer, maintenance man, commercial fisherman, weapons mechanic, university administrator and teacher, as well as a television writer and producer (Simon & Simon, 21 Jump Street, Star Trek: The Next Generation'').  Through January 2020, Perry has published 27 novels.  He lives in Southern California with his wife, author Jo (née Lee), and their two children.

Bibliography

Butcher's Boy series

Jane Whitefield series

Jack Till series

Stand-alone novels

References

External links
Official site
Interview with Thomas Perry
"The Professional," an overview of Perry's work by Ethan Iverson
Modern Signed Books BlogTalkRadio Interview with Rodger Nichols about Forty Thieves (March 2016)

1947 births
Living people
20th-century American novelists
21st-century American novelists
American male novelists
American mystery writers
American thriller writers
Edgar Award winners
Writers from California
Cornell University alumni
People from Tonawanda, New York
20th-century American male writers
21st-century American male writers
Novelists from New York (state)
Barry Award winners